Jari Niinimäki (born 1 December 1957) is a Finnish former international footballer.

Club career
He played most of his career at his home-town club FC Ilves. The exceptions were only the first two seasons he played as senior, when he played with third-tier Finnish side TPV Tampere, and, later in 1986, when he played abroad in Sweden with AIK Solna in the 1986 Allsvenskan.

He spent short time in Yugoslavia with Serbian club FK Partizan. He failed to make a debut in an official game, but made one appearance and scored two goals in a friendly match.

International career
He made 3 appearances for Finland national team in 1986.

Honours
Ilves
Veikkausliiga: 1983
Finnish Cup: 1979

Personal life
His son, Jesse Niinimäki, became a professional ice hockey player.

References

1957 births
Living people
Footballers from Tampere
Finnish footballers
Finland international footballers
Association football forwards
FC Ilves players
Veikkausliiga players
AIK Fotboll players
Allsvenskan players
Finnish expatriate footballers
Expatriate footballers in Sweden
Finnish expatriate sportspeople in Sweden
Mestaruussarja players